The 1841 Rhode Island gubernatorial election was held on April 21, 1841.

Incumbent Whig Governor Samuel Ward King won re-election without opposition.

General election

Candidates
Samuel Ward King, Whig, incumbent Governor

Results

References

1841
Rhode Island
Gubernatorial